The 1982 World Championship Tennis Spring Finals was a tennis tournament played on indoor carpet courts. It was the 12th edition of the WCT Finals and was part of the 1982 World Championship Tennis circuit since World Championship Tennis had split from the Grand Prix tennis circuit. It was played at the Reunion Arena in Dallas, Texas in the United States and was held from April 20 through April 26, 1982. Second-seeded Ivan Lendl won the title.

Final

Singles

 Ivan Lendl defeated  John McEnroe 6–2, 3–6, 6–3, 6–3
 It was Lendl's 7th singles title of the year and the 24th of his career.

References

External links
 ITF – Dallas WCT tournament edition details

 
World Championship Tennis Finals
WCT Finals